Ronald Marapon dela Rosa (born January 21, 1962), also known as Bato, is a Filipino politician and retired police officer who is currently serving as a senator of the Philippines since 2019. He served under the Duterte administration as the chief of the Philippine National Police from July 1, 2016, to April 19, 2018, overseeing the government's anti-drug campaign; he also served as the Director General of the Bureau of Corrections from April 30 to October 12, 2018.

Early life and education
Dela Rosa was born on January 21, 1962, at Barangay Bato, Santa Cruz, Davao del Sur, to Teodoro Diamaton dela Rosa Sr. and Anesia Cruspero Marapon. His family was "dirt poor" as his father earned little money working as a tricycle driver. The young Dela Rosa worked as a fish market porter and bus conductor.

Dela Rosa is a senator who went to Mindanao State University (MSU) to study for a Bachelor of Science degree in public administration. In 1982, he left MSU to join the Philippine Military Academy (PMA) and graduated in 1986 as part of PMA Sinagtala class. He then earned a Master of Public Administration degree in 1998 and a Ph.D. in development administration in 2006 from the University of Southeastern Philippines in Davao City.

Dela Rosa completed a Scout Ranger Orientation Course, Police Intelligence Officer Advance Course, Police Officers' Comptrollership Course, and the Police Safety Officer Course. He also attended training courses of the FBI Academy and U.S. Army Ranger School in the United States, and Air Marshal Instructors Course by the Australian Federal Police.

Dela Rosa was nicknamed "Bato" during his first assignment in Davao, when his upperclassmen likened his body to a rock.

Police career

Early career (1986–2012)

Dela Rosa joined the police force in 1986 as a Lieutenant of the now-defunct Philippine Constabulary in Davao City.  In 1992, he was designated as Chief Inspector and worked as one of the staff at Police Regional Office (PRO)-Davao. In 1997, he was designated as police provincial director of Compostela Valley.

In 1999, he was assigned to the office of the Police Director of the Philippine National Police (PNP) at Camp Crame in Quezon City. In 2001, he returned to PRO-Davao and continued his service as deputy chief of the Office of the Regional Personnel and Human Resource and Development Division (ORPHRDD) of Region XI. In 2003, he was promoted to Police Superintendent and was assigned to Camp Catitipan in Davao City. He was then transferred to the Directorate for Human Resources Doctrine and Development as head of training.  In 2005, he was assigned to the Davao City Police Office (DCPO) as a city personnel officer. After eight months, he was transferred back to PRO-Davao and was promoted as chief of the Regional Intelligence and Investigation Division (RIID).  In 2007, he became the director of the Compostela Valley Provincial Police Office (CVPPO) as its police chief. In 2008, he was promoted to a rank of Senior Superintendent. In 2009, he was moved to Davao del Sur where he served as director of the Davao del Sur Provincial Police Office (DSPPO). In 2011, he became the chief of the Regional Logistics and Research Development Division (RL-RDD) in PRO-Davao. In 2012, he was assigned to Davao City as the new director of the Davao City Police Office.

Davao City Police Office Chief (2012–2013)
Dela Rosa served as the chief of the Davao City Police Office from January 2012 to October 2013 under Mayors Sara Duterte (in office: June 30, 2010 – June 30, 2013) and Rodrigo Duterte (in office: June 30, 2013 – June 30, 2016). In 2012, he led the crackdown on the carnapping syndicate allegedly masterminded by Ryan "Baktin" Yu. In July 2013, he headed the successful rescue of the kidnapped Filipino-Chinese businesswoman Sally Chua. He also directed the implementation of Oplan Tokhang (Cebuano portmanteau for tuktok, "knock", and hangyo, "persuade") a campaign against illegal drugs where the police literally knock on the doors of suspected drug users and distributors and persuade them to cease their illegal activities; and Oplan Pakgang, (Cebuano portmanteau for “Pitulon ang Kabatan-onan sa Gang”, “Disciplining Youths in Gangs”) where the police, through a series of lectures and discussions, discouraged Davao City's youth from joining criminal gangs and other illegal activities.

Camp Crame (2013–2016)

After serving as Davao City Police Chief, Dela Rosa was assigned to the national headquarters of the Philippine National Police in Camp Crame where he worked for the PNP Intelligence Group from October 2013 to December 2014.

In 2015, Dela Rosa became a member of the PNP Board of Inquiry which investigated the Mamasapano clash. The aforementioned incident claimed the lives of 44 Special Action Force commandos, 17 Moro Islamic Liberation Front members and five civilians while the cops were on a mission to arrest international terrorist Zulkifli Abdhir, alias Marwan.

Dela Rosa also served as the  executive officer of the Directorate for Human Resource and Doctrine Development (HRDD).

A few days before the May 9, 2016 Philippine general election, Dela Rosa was relieved as brigade commander of the Reactionary Standby Support Force (RSSF) of the Philippine National Police allegedly due to his Facebook posts seen to be in favour of then-presidential candidate Rodrigo Duterte. A Facebook status posted on May 1, 2016, which had gone viral read: 

During the PiliPinas Debates 2016 – Luzon leg, the third and final presidential debate, Duterte said that his main campaign donor was Emilio Aguinaldo, while Liberal Party standard-bearer Mar Roxas quoted Batman. However, Dela Rosa's commanding officer at that time, PNP deputy chief for operations Deputy Director-General Danilo Constantino, denied that Dela Rosa's Facebook posts were the main reasons why he was relieved of his duty. According to Deputy Director General Constantino, Chief Superintendent Dela Rosa was relieved from the Reactionary Standby Support Force (RSSF) so that he could focus on his responsibilities as executive officer of the PNP Directorate for Human Resource and Doctrine Development (HRDD). Nonetheless, Constantino stated that the PNP Internal Affairs Service will investigate Dela Rosa's Facebook posts for possible administrative liabilities as the officers of the Philippine National Police are required to be neutral and apolitical during the elections.

On August 25, 2016, the newly appointed Chief of the National Police stated “You know who these drug lords are. Do you want to kill them? Kill them. It’s okay because you're the victim here.” “If you want, you know who these drug lords are. Go to their houses. Pour gasoline in their houses, set it on fire. Show them you’re angry,”

Rise to prominence as head police chief and BuCor director (2016–2018)

Dela Rosa was handpicked by then presumptive President Rodrigo Duterte as the new PNP Chief on May 19, 2016.  On July 1, 2016, he was officially sworn in as the 21st chief of the Philippine National Police while being promoted to Director-General, the highest-ranked PNP officer. In October 2017, Dela Rosa accused Vice President Leni Robredo of having political ambitions to become president despite still working in her current job. After a few days, he hinted that he himself may run for president in 2022 and would double the pay of police officers if elected. He was set to retire on January 21 due to the mandatory retirement at age 56, but his term was extended for 3 months until April 21, 2018.

During his stint as PNP chief, Dela Rosa made the headlines regularly as he led the controversial drug war and Oplan Tokhang operations throughout the country. Several groups including human rights groups and religious leaders strongly objected Dela Rosa and President Rodrigo Duterte's initiatives. The controversy has been widely condemned locally and internationally for the number of deaths resulting from police operations and allegations of systematic extrajudicial executions including planting fabricated evidence to make it appear a suspected drug personality has possession of drugs and resisting arrest from authorities. The drug-related killings reached up to the United Nations Human Rights Council as it caused a death toll total of 12,000 according to reports of news organizations and human rights groups. In 2019, during his campaign, Dela Rosa took pride of it as it lessened the crime rate and resulted in millions of drug personalities surrendering to the authorities.

In May 2018, Dela Rosa was appointed as Director General of the Bureau of Corrections. He held the post from April 30, 2018, until October 12, 2018.

Political career

Senator of the Philippines (2019–present)

Dela Rosa placed a bid for a Senate seat and won placing fifth overall, garnering 19 million votes in the 2019 Philippine Senate election. Dela Rosa took office on June 30, 2019. Dela Rosa Chaired the Senate Committee on Public Order and Dangerous Drugs.

In August 2019, Dela Rosa caused controversy when he said in an interview that convicted rapist-murderer and former Calauan mayor Antonio Sanchez "deserves a second chance". Dela Rosa said that "if it is determined by the Board of Pardons and Parole that he deserves that commutation, then why not? He deserves a second chance in life." He drew flak among netizens who opposed his remark and behaviour after he also got angry at a student leader raising the issue of what Dela Rosa said regarding Sanchez' possible release while at a Senate hearing on bringing back the mandatory ROTC for senior high school students. Dela Rosa said that the question was "irrelevant to the topic that was being discussed" during the session.

Despite some issues that were raised against him, Dela Rosa still became productive in his first months in office. Dela Rosa has already filed numerous bills including bringing back capital punishment to the country specifically for drug traffickers which is yet to be passed. Among the initial bills he prioritised were an act regulating the use of government ambulances, the Department of Overseas Filipino Act, police scholarships for qualifying students in all barangays, establishing crisis centre for street children in every region in the Philippines, the creation of Barangay Community Peace and Order Council, and the job training for mature or older workers.

In June 2021, Dela Rosa sponsored the Bureau of Fire Protection (BFP) Modernization Bill in the plenary for the Senate to be ratified. The amendment, which Dela Rosa has inserted without authorization, would allow BFP personnel to carry short firearms during fire emergencies and disasters, provided that training will be undertaken with the Department of Interior and Local Government and the Philippine National Police. Dela Rosa said only 2,282 out the total 30,290 BFP personnel would be allowed to carry short firearms to protect their colleagues. He explained in Filipino, "...the usual complaint of our firefighters, that during fire incidents, there are people who try to take away their water hoses. Sometimes, there are firefighters who get stabbed because there are people who want their houses to be saved from the fire first." Some senators declined to ratify the reform but were outvoted; President Rodrigo Duterte signed the bill into law in September 2021.

2022 presidential campaign

On October 8, 2021, the PDP–Laban faction supported by President Duterte announced dela Rosa as their candidate for president of the Philippines in the 2022 election, the same day dela Rosa filed his certificate of candidacy before the Commission on Elections. However, on November 13, 2021, the same day that Sara Duterte filed her candidacy as the running mate of Bongbong Marcos, dela Rosa withdrew his candidacy as per party's decision.

Personal life 

Dela Rosa has been married to Nancy Johnson Comandante since 1989, and they have three children together. During his wedding, then-Davao City Mayor Rodrigo Duterte stood as one of the principal sponsors. Duterte and Dela Rosa had known each other since 1986. He has described Duterte as "the greatest influence" in his career.

In May 2017, dela Rosa's only son, Rock, entered the Philippine National Police Academy as a cadet.

On June 19, 2017, dela Rosa was the guest of honor and speaker at the celebration of José Rizal’s 156th birth anniversary. He claimed that he was related to the national hero through a common ancestor named Ines dela Rosa.

Dela Rosa is a Catholic. In a June 2016 radio interview on DZMM, Dela Rosa mentioned that he frequently goes to confession to seek forgiveness after he has killed criminals, declaring that he is "no cold-blooded killer".

Since he became the PNP chief, he has appeared or guested in several TV shows, most notably in the Trabahula segment of ABS-CBN's noontime variety show, It's Showtime, and GMA's Sunday variety show, Sunday PinaSaya where he met Rodney "Dugong" Juterte, President Rodrigo Duterte's comedic impersonator portrayed by Jose Manalo.

Dela Rosa is a longtime fan of PBA team Barangay Ginebra San Miguel.

On November 21, 2020, Dela Rosa announced that he tested positive for COVID-19 after having a swab antigen test on the night before. He became the fifth senator to contract the virus. Prior to this, he has physically attended some Senate sessions, with the most recent being on November 18. He has advised his close contacts to "do the appropriate protocols". Dela Rosa recovered from COVID-19.

In popular culture
Dela Rosa is portrayed by Robin Padilla in Adolfo Alix Jr.'s 2019 biographical action film Bato: The General Ronald dela Rosa Story.

See also 
 Philippine Drug War

Notes

References

Filipino police chiefs
Filipino Roman Catholics
Living people
1962 births
People indicted for crimes against humanity
People indicted by the International Criminal Court
Senators of the 18th Congress of the Philippines
People from Davao del Sur
Philippine Military Academy alumni
Mindanao State University alumni
Duterte administration personnel
People of the Philippine Drug War
Philippine Military Academy Class of 1986
PDP–Laban politicians
Visayan people
Senators of the 19th Congress of the Philippines